Nicktoons Nitro is a racing video game which is a sequel to Nicktoons Racing and Nicktoons Winners Cup Racing. It features Nicktoons characters from the SpongeBob SquarePants, Danny Phantom, The Adventures of Jimmy Neutron: Boy Genius, The Fairly OddParents, Invader Zim, and Avatar: The Last Airbender franchises. The game was released in August 2008 as an arcade game by developer Raw Thrills.

Story
An average day in Bikini Bottom turns sour for SpongeBob SquarePants when he gets sucked into a mysterious portal. Several other Nicktoons are also snatched away from their own worlds and all are soon stranded in a mysterious laboratory. They then see the being responsible for their kidnapping: Lord Nitro, who desires that the Nicktoons race through his planet solely for his amusement. Given unique vehicles and sent into racetracks based on their homeworlds, the Nicktoons compete not just for victory, but to escape from their mysterious captor.

When all six race courses are cleared, Lord Nitro emerges from his robotic suit and challenges them to a final race. After defeating Nitro on his Planet Nitro racetrack, the Nicktoons demand to be set free. Nitro denies their request and sets a self-destruct timer on his robotic suit before flying off. Jimmy then quickly reprograms the suit to make it send everyone back to their own home worlds.

References

2008 video games
Nicktoons video games
Kart racing video games
Nicktoon racing games
Arcade video games
Arcade-only video games
Crossover racing games
SpongeBob SquarePants video games
Danny Phantom video games
Invader Zim video games
The Adventures of Jimmy Neutron: Boy Genius video games
Avatar: The Last Airbender games
Video games based on The Fairly OddParents
Video games developed in the United States
Raw Thrills games
Multiplayer and single-player video games